"One More Night" is a pop ballad performed by German singer Sandra. The song was written by Michael Cretu, Klaus Hirschburger and Frank Peterson, and produced by Cretu. It was released as the third and final single from Sandra's fourth studio album, Paintings in Yellow, in September 1990. The single became only a moderate top 40 hit in Germany.

The music video for the song was directed by Dieter Trattmann and is set on the beaches of the Balearic Islands. The clip was released on Sandra's VHS video compilation 18 Greatest Hits in 1992 and the 2003 DVD The Complete History.

A remix of the song was included on Sandra's 2006 retrospective Reflections.

Formats and track listings
 7" single
 "One More Night" (Single Version) – 3:41
 "The Journey" (Edit) – 2:42

 12" single
A1. "One More Night" (Extended Version) – 5:08
A2. "One More Night" (Single Version) – 3:41
B. "The Journey" (Album Version) – 7:27

 CD maxi single
 "One More Night" (Single Version) – 3:41
 "The Journey" (Album Version) – 7:27
 "One More Night" (Extended Version) – 5:08

Charts

References

External links
 "One More Night" at Discogs

1990 singles
1990 songs
Sandra (singer) songs
Song recordings produced by Michael Cretu
Songs written by Frank Peterson
Songs written by Klaus Hirschburger
Songs written by Michael Cretu
Virgin Records singles